Sir Wilfrid Laurier Secondary School may refer to:

 Sir Wilfrid Laurier Secondary School (London, Ontario), a secondary school in London, Ontario
 Sir Wilfrid Laurier Secondary School (Ottawa), a secondary school in Ottawa, Ontario